A redistribution layer (RDL) is an extra metal layer on an integrated circuit that makes its I/O pads available in other locations of the chip, for better access to the pads where necessary.

When an integrated circuit is manufactured, it usually has a set of I/O pads that are wirebonded to the pins of the package. A redistribution layer is an extra layer of wiring on the chip that enables bond out from different locations on the chip, making chip-to-chip bonding simpler. Another example of the use for RDL is for spreading the contact points around the die so that solder balls can be applied, and the thermal stress of mounting can be spread.

References

External links

 Redistribution tutorial 

Semiconductor device fabrication
Packaging (microfabrication)